Forty Years or  Veertig Jaren  is a 1938 Dutch film directed by Edmond T. Gréville.

Cast
Cees Laseur	... 	Rolf van Meerle
Lily Bouwmeester	... 	Annetje Maasdonk
Matthieu van Eysden	... 	Frans Maasdonk
Ank van der Moer	... 	Eline Verhulst
Eduard Verkade	... 	Zijne excellentie van Meerle
Adolphe Engers	... 	Jan de Oude
Paul Steenbergen	... 	Wim Maasdonk
Cor Van der Lugt Melsert	... 	Dick Maasdonk
Martha Posno	... 	Lottie van Meerle
Myra Ward	... 	Lily Burger

External links 
 

1938 films
Dutch black-and-white films
Films directed by Edmond T. Gréville
1938 drama films
Dutch drama films